Hill City may refer to: 

United States
Hill City, Georgia
Hill City, Idaho
Hill City, Kansas
Hill City, Minnesota
Hill City, South Dakota
Lynchburg, Virginia, nicknamed Hill City

Malaysia
Ipoh, nicknamed Hill City

Other uses
Hill City (fashion), a subsidiary fashion label of Gap Inc.